Magic Lunchbox are an original rock band from Sydney, Australia.

They have released three albums and one EP, most recently through Nonzero Records.

Discography

Albums
 Dickheads & Rainbows
 What Time is the Orgy?
 Spastique

EPs
 The Yeeros Living Dangerously

References

External links
 Official website
 Album review

Australian alternative rock groups